Solute carrier family 10 member 4 is a protein that in humans is encoded by the SLC10A4 gene. In mice, it appears to promote acidification of synaptic vesicles containing monoamines, enhancing their uptake, and is co-expressed with VMAT2 and VAChT.

References

Further reading